Bruno Bianco Alberto G. G. Barnabe (3 April 1905 – 20 June 1998) was an English film and stage actor. He performed in the West End, on Broadway, and in Egypt, Australia and New Zealand.

Biography 
Barnabe was born in St Giles, London on 3 April 1905 to Tina (née Bendi) and Louis Vincent Barnabe. He married Avice Landone, who died in 1976. He trained for the stage at the Royal Academy of Dramatic Art where he studied mime under Theodore Komisarjevsky. Barnabe served with the British Armed Forces from 1942 through 1946. He died in June 1998.

Stage career 
Barnabe made his first stage appearance on 4 April 1927 playing a wedding guest in The Dybbuk at the Royalty Theatre. In October 1928, Barnabe travelled to Egypt as a member of a Shakespearean company led by Robert Atkins. The following year he travelled to the United States with Ben Greet; during this trip he portrayed Everyman at Columbia University, which marked his first stage appearance in New York City. His first and only appearance on Broadway came in 1935 in the original production of Escape Me Never at the Shubert Theatre. In 1937, Barnabe went on a tour of Australia and New Zealand in a company led by Fay Compton. Other major venues at which Barnabe appeared include the Criterion Theatre, the Q Theatre and the Theatre Royal, Windsor.

Film career 
Barnabe appeared in films as early as 1927 and appeared on television as early as 1937. He appeared on numerous television shows throughout the 1960s and 1970s, including Maigret, Danger Island, The Troubleshooters and Jesus of Nazareth. Films in which Barnabe acted include Man in the Shadow (1957), Pit of Darkness (1961), The Mummy's Shroud (1967), and Sinbad and the Eye of the Tiger (1977). He also appeared in a television adaptation of King Richard the Second in 1978.

Filmography

Film

Television

Notes 

1905 births
1998 deaths
English male stage actors
English male film actors
Alumni of RADA
20th-century English male actors
British military personnel of World War II